The following are the winners of the 22nd annual ENnie Awards, held in 2022:

Judges’ Spotlight Winners

Amelia Antrim – Dwelling, Good Luck Press  Author: Seb Pines

Di – Stack of Goblins, CobblePath Games  Author: Jack Milton

Christopher Gath – Shanty Hunters, Molten Sulfur Press  Author: Tristan Zimmerman

Salim Hakima – Kobold Guide to Monsters, Kobold Press  Authors: Monte Cook, Wolfgang Baur, Mike Mason, Crystal Frasier, Mike Shea, Shanna Germain, Steve Winter, and many more

Shiny O’Brien – Wickedness, Possum Creek Games  Author: M Veselak

Fan Award for Best Publisher: Darrington Press

References

External links
 2022 ENnie Awards

 
ENnies winners